Thomas Edmund Gleisner  (born 24 October 1962) is an Australian comedian, television presenter, producer, director, writer, occasional actor and author. Gleisner currently hosts Network 10's Have You Been Paying Attention?.

Early life and education
Gleisner was educated at Xavier College in Melbourne, Australia.  Gleisner attended the University of Melbourne in the 1980s, and graduated with a Bachelor of Arts and Bachelor of Laws in 1987. He was a law student in University of Melbourne when he began working with Santo Cilauro and Rob Sitch in the 1983 Law Revue Legal A.I.D.S.. Gleisner wrote and performed in the 1985 Melbourne University Revue Too Cool for Sandals, and was credited as a writer on The D-Generation (1986–1987) but not as a regular performer.

He did, however, turn up on numerous occasions as a guest star (he featured more prominently in the second season, to fill in for Rob Sitch who was juggling writing/performing for the show with his studies), and on the album The Satanic Sketches. Gleisner would go on to perform in the D-Gen's late-eighties Triple M radio show (and its spin-off album The Breakfast Tapes), and then starred in, and wrote for, ABC's The Late Show (1992–1993). He is remembered in The Late Show as the newsreader of Late Show News, the co-host of Countdown Classics with Jane Kennedy and the interviewer of stuntman Rob Sitch in Shitscared, although he appeared in various other sketches (including a recurring role as brainless bush-traveler "Wallaby Jack").

Television, radio, and film
When The Late Show finished, Gleisner co-founded Working Dog Productions, along with Santo Cilauro, Jane Kennedy and Rob Sitch. Their first venture was Frontline which ran on the ABC from 1994 until 1997. Gleisner was a writer/producer/director, and also had a minor role as photocopier repairman Colin Konica.

In 1995, Gleisner starred as mute cop Poncho on Funky Squad on ABC, another Working Dog comedy which he co-created and served on as one of the writer/producer/directors. Gleisner co-wrote the Working Dog films The Castle (1997), The Dish (2000) and Any Questions for Ben? (2012). He also hosted and co-executive produced the popular Network Ten program The Panel, (1998–2004). Gleisner has also appeared with Rob Sitch as a presenter of the ABC TV fly-fishing documentary A River Somewhere (1997–1998). He also wrote and directed the Glenn Robbins comedy, All Aussie Adventures (2001–2002, 2004, 2018), was the judge on the improvised comedy program Thank God You're Here (2006–2009), and co-wrote/co-produced Working Dog's The Hollowmen (2008), Utopia (2014-2019), and Pacific Heat (2016). He now is host of the popular Australian quiz show Have You Been Paying Attention? (2013–present), as well as a producer for The Cheap Seats (2021–present).

Books

Gleisner has written four comedic books in the persona of a fictitious cricketer, Warwick Todd, The Warwick Todd Diaries (1997), Warwick Todd: Back in the Baggy Green (1998), Warwick Todd Goes The Tonk (2001) and Warwick Todd – Up in the Block Hole (2009). Gleisner has appeared in his Warwick Todd persona in guest appearances on TV. Gleisner has also written a number of fly fishing books along with Rob Sitch, and along with Sitch and Santo Cilauro, is responsible for the travel guide parodies in the "Jetlag Travel Guide" series. As of 2006, this series stands at the Eastern Europe send-up of Molvanîa: A Land Untouched by Modern Dentistry, parody of Southeast Asian destinations Phaic Tăn: Sunstroke on a Shoestring and Central American send up San Sombrèro: A Land of Carnivals, Cocktails and Coups.

Gleisner is the chairman of Challenge, an Australian cancer support organisation.

He is also passionate about raising autism awareness; he was inspired to do so by the child of a dear friend of his and his wife.

References

External links

1962 births
Australian male comedians
Australian television talk show hosts
Australian game show hosts
Australian parodists
Living people
People educated at Xavier College
Melbourne Law School alumni
Australian film studio executives
Officers of the Order of Australia
People from the City of Boroondara